Swan Hills Airport  is located  south of Swan Hills, Alberta, Canada.

References

External links
Place to Fly on COPA's Places to Fly airport directory

Registered aerodromes in Alberta
Big Lakes County